Zimbabwean New Zealanders are New Zealand citizens who are fully or partially of Zimbabwean descent or Zimbabwe-born people who reside in New Zealand.  They include migrants to New Zealand of people from Zimbabwe, as well as their descendants. Today, over 5,614 people in New Zealand have Zimbabwean ancestry in 2016, making them the second largest source of African immigrants to New Zealand after South Africa.

Despite this, they form one of New Zealand's smaller immigrant communities, often blending into Kiwi society, as anglophones, compared to the much larger Polynesian and Asian communities. New Zealand and Zimbabwe have long shared cultural ties, as part of the Commonwealth of Nations, particularly in the realms of sport and education, which has made the country a familiar and attractive destination for Zimbabweans. Initially, many Zimbabwean New Zealanders were of white Zimbabwean origin, however as immigration has grown since 2000, the population has diversified to reflect the demographics of Zimbabwe, with a notable plurality of Shona people.

Zimbabwean Kiwis are overwhelmingly concentrated on the North Island, particularly Wellington, Auckland and Hamilton. They form the second largest African community after South Africans and are predominantly English-speaking and well educated, thus integrating well into Kiwi society.

Notable Zimbabwean New Zealanders
 Colin de Grandhomme - Dual Kiwi-Zimbabwean cricket player for the New Zealand national cricket team
 Gareth Evans - Rugby player for Hawkes Bay and the Hamilton Chiefs in Super Rugby
 Dion Ebrahim -  cricket coach for Central Districts and former player for the Zimbabwe national cricket team
 Tinashe Marowa - New Zealand professional footballer for Eastern Suburbs.
 Tamupiwa Dimairo - professional footballer  for the Wellington Phoenix FC and  Bruno's Magpies 
 Mark Hewlett - radio host
 Ryan Sissons - triathlete representing New Zealand at the Olympics
 Peter Younghusband - cricket player for the Wellington Firebirds

See also
 Zimbabwean diaspora
 Zimbabwean Australians
 Zimbabweans in the United Kingdom
 Zimbabwean Canadians
 Zimbabwean Americans

References

African New Zealander